List of asteroid close approaches to Earth in 2012 is a listing of asteroids noted for their close approach to planet Earth

Timeline of close approaches less than one lunar distance from Earth in 2012 
A list of known near-Earth asteroid close approaches less than 1 lunar distance (384,400 km or 0.00256 AU) from Earth in 2012.

 

 

 

 

 

This list does not include any of the objects that collided with earth in 2012, none of which were discovered in advance, but were recorded by sensors designed to detect detonation of nuclear devices.

Warning Times by Size 
This sub-section visualises the warning times of the close approaches listed in the above table, depending on the size of the asteroid. The sizes of the charts show the relative sizes of the asteroids to scale. For comparison, the approximate size of a person is also shown. This is based the absolute magnitude of each asteroid, an approximate measure of size based on brightness.

Abs Magnitude 30 and greater
 (size of a person for comparison)

Abs Magnitude 29-30

Absolute Magnitude 28-29

Absolute Magnitude 27-28

Absolute Magnitude 26-27

Absolute Magnitude 25-26
 
Absolute Magnitude less than 25 (largest)

Notes

See also
List of asteroid close approaches to Earth
List of asteroid close approaches to Earth in 2011
List of asteroid close approaches to Earth in 2013

References 

 
close approaches to Earth in 2012
Near-Earth asteroids